Hard Labor is the eleventh album by American rock band Three Dog Night, released in 1974. For this album, the band replaced long-time producer Richard Podolor with Jimmy Ienner, who was known for his production work with the Raspberries.

Cover artwork 
The original album cover, depicting the birth of a record album, was deemed too controversial and was first included with a manila file folder covering most of the cover. This was soon reworked with a huge Band-Aid covering the "birth".  Subsequent printings had the Band-Aid printed directly on the cover.  The packaging also includes an attached "birth record sheet" for the album. The CD reissue by MCA Records in the 1990s restored the cover to its original look showing the record.

Reception

Tom Von Malder of the Daily Herald called Hard Labor the band's finest record up to that point, applauding the production and finding the choice of songs representing the band at "its most competent, most mature level". Malder singled out "The Show Must Go On" and "I'd Be So Happy" as its two best, and "almost perfect", songs. Cash Box called Inner's production "immaculate as always" and wrote that the album was marked by "mood changes both subtle and obvious", making it a "fantastic study in theatrical and musical contrast". Billboard found the track listing a "fine mix of material" and wrote that the instrumental section was "tight and almost perfect".

Circus Raves writer Jon Tiven gave the record "two ears"—indicating an album to "listen to ... 'til the grooves grow old" and wrote that the band "are the best when they're transforming half-arsed songs into good ones, but they run into trouble when the original rendition of the tune was fine in the first place (e.g. 'The Show Must Go On')." Writing retrospectively, Joseph McCombs of AllMusic felt that the album's preference for songs with solo vocals rather than the group's previous use of harmonies led to the band "los[ing] much of their soul and spirit" and saw the album as "show[ing] the growing cracks in the band's armor". Like Malder, McCombs found "I'd Be So Happy" and "The Show Must Go On" the highlights of the album.

Track listing

Personnel
Mike Allsup – banjo, guitars
Jimmy Greenspoon – keyboard
Danny Hutton – lead vocals, background vocals
Skip Konte – keyboard, ARP, chamberlin
Chuck Negron – lead vocals, background vocals 
Jack Ryland – bass
Joe Schermie – bass
Floyd Sneed – percussion, drums
Cory Wells – lead vocals, background vocals
Jimmy Iovine – production

Production
Producer: Jimmy Ienner
Engineers: Greg Calbi, Roy Cicala, Dennis Ferrante, Jimmy Ienner, Jay Messina, Tom Rabstenek, John Stronach
Assistant engineers: Corky Stasiak
Remixing: Roy Cicala, Jay Messina
Arranger: Three Dog Night
Art direction and photography: Ed Caraeff
Design: David Larkham

Charts

Certifications

References

1974 albums
Three Dog Night albums
Albums produced by Jimmy Ienner
Dunhill Records albums